Jason Lee Scott is a fictional character and the main protagonist in the Power Rangers franchise, played by actor Austin St. John. Jason is not the original Red Ranger albeit the first on screen Red Ranger of Mighty Morphin Power Rangers. In Season 2 of Mighty Morphin Power Rangers, it is established that Rocko, who is Rocky's Ancestor, is the first Red Ranger of the Mighty Morphin Power Rangers team. In Power Rangers Dino Fury it is established that Zayto is the very first Red Ranger in history. He later becomes the temporary Gold Ranger in Power Rangers Zeo and cannot handle the Power, therefore it is taken away from him. He then drops out of school and is seen again in the Turbo movie. He does not appear at the graduation ceremony with the other Rangers, therefore it is undetermined if he ever graduated High School. He once again becomes the Red Ranger by Power Rangers: Beast Morphers, alongside his original team. A reimagined version of Jason (minus the Lee surname and now blonde) appears in the 2017 reboot film, played by Australian actor Dacre Montgomery.

According to a contest held by ABC Family in 2004, Jason was voted as the #1 Ranger of all time. The love of nostalgia was the deciding factor. A subsequent contest on Toon Disney in 2007 also voted him as the most popular Power Ranger also due to nostalgia. As stated at the first Power Morphicon, Jason retained this title due to nostalgia.

Fictional character history

Mighty Morphin Power Rangers
Jason is a martial artist and a power ranger. from the fictional town of Angel Grove, California. At the beginning of Mighty Morphin Power Rangers, he and his closest friends Zack Taylor, Billy Cranston, Trini Kwan and Kimberly Hart are selected by Zordon and Alpha 5 as the five "teenagers with attitude" to become the original Power Rangers and defend Earth from the forces of the evil Rita Repulsa. When Zordon first confronts the teens to give them their powers, Jason is the only one who initially believes him. Jason becomes the Red Power Ranger and is given the Dinozord Power Coin of the Tyrannosaurus, obtains the Tyrannosaurus Dinozord (a colossal assault vehicle) and is made the team leader. He leads the Rangers into many battles against Rita's monsters, establishing a rivalry with Rita's number one henchman Goldar.

At first glance, Jason appears to be the stereotypical jock type, primarily interested in sports&dash;particularly martial arts. Beneath the surface, however, he is big-hearted, kind, outgoing, friendly and always willing to help someone out when it is needed—such as when he takes Billy under his wing and teaches him martial arts to boost his confidence and teach him self-defense. Aside from martial arts, Jason is an accomplished athlete, weight trainer and certified scuba diving instructor.

When Tommy Oliver comes in, he becomes competitive rivals with Jason, matching him in a martial arts competition. Rita then manipulates Tommy, turning him into the evil Green Ranger and he later turns into the white power ranger  and sends him into battle. He later captures Jason, steals his Power Morpher and imprisons him in Rita's Dark Dimension where he would have to fight Goldar to retrieve his Morpher. The Green Ranger eventually arrives at the scene with orders to destroy Jason, but Billy, Trini and Alpha manage to repair the damage Tommy did to the Command Center, in time to find Jason and retrieve him seconds before Tommy kills him. Later, Jason squares off with Tommy on Earth and ultimately defeats him in combat when he hurls his energized Power Sword at the Green Ranger, disarming him and then uses his Blade Blaster to destroy the Sword of Darkness that Rita had given to Tommy, due to the sword's ability to maintain her evil spell on him. Jason then convinces Tommy to join the team and use his powers against Rita.

Later, Rita crafts a Green Candle out of special wax that had been enchanted with Tommy's touch when he was evil. Once lit, the candle continues to burn until it is gone and when it is, so too would Tommy's powers. Because Tommy's proximity to the candle accelerates the candle's melting process, Tommy is captured and placed close to it by Goldar. However, he eventually escapes and Jason is left to retrieve the candle. Jason does well in his fight with Goldar but gets recalled into the battle with Rita's Cyclops monster to save Angel Grove.

Following the failure of destroying the Green Candle, Tommy entrusts Jason with his Power Coin to prevent it from falling into Rita's hands again, allowing him access to the Green Ranger's powers (including the Dragon Shield and the Dragon Dagger, which also allows him to call the Dragonzord to aid the Rangers, even while Jason controls the Megazord, making him twice as powerful).

One of Jason's most cunning moments is the gambit he plays against Goldar, who kidnaps the parents of Angel Grove High's students, then ransoms them for the Ranger's five Power Coins. Jason would later reveal that though he gave up his Tyrannosaurus Power Coin to Goldar, he kept the Dragon Power Coin. With it, Tommy eventually regains his Green Ranger powers, retrieves the other Ranger's Power Coins and helps the team save their captive parents. In the next season, Tommy Oliver is given the same choice of giving up the Rangers coins in exchange for the teen embassadors that were kidnapped. Tommy makes the smart decision and gives Goldar fake coins made of chocolate.  Thus proving he is smarter and a better leader then Jason Lee Scott ever was. 

When Lord Zedd arrives and overruns Rita, he sends his new brand of Putty Patrollers to Earth. The Putties possess superior strength to Rita's Putties, but it is Jason who discovers their weak spot. To compete with their new enemy's more powerful monsters, the Dinozords are upgraded into the mythical Thunderzords; Jason's Dinozord becomes the Red Dragon Thunderzord, which can transform into a humanoid form. As with the Tyrannosaurus, the Red Dragon can defeat a monster on its own, separate from the Megazord formation.

Eventually, Tommy loses his Green Ranger powers again, and Jason suffers from immense guilt because of it. Choosing to capitalize on Jason's vulnerability, Zedd creates candles for Zack, Billy, Trini and Kimberly that would remove their links to the Morphing Grid, just as Rita did to Tommy. Jason, with the help of Zordon's confidence in him, manages to save his friends and prevent them from losing their powers. Following the victory, Jason wins a martial arts trophy and dedicates it to Tommy, who soon after returns as the White Ranger and is named the new leader of the team by Zordon. Tommy's comeback relieves Jason's guilt towards him and accepting him as his successor as the team's leader and becoming the a follower to Tommy as he should be for his constant failures as a leader

Some time later, Jason, Trini and Zack are chosen to act as ambassadors at a Peace Conference in Switzerland (after the actors playing the characters left the show over contract disputes, the characters simply being shown in their Ranger uniforms, using old footage, or with doubles who were never directly facing the cameras, until the transfer could be incorporated into the plot of the show), and are forced to leave the team. Zordon chooses Rocky DeSantos to replace Jason as the Red Ranger.

Power Rangers Zeo

Jason returns in Power Rangers Zeo, taking over the powers of the Gold Zeo Ranger from Trey of Triforia when Trey went injured in a fight with Varox bounty hunters and required someone else to hold his powers until he could heal. His return is greatly welcomed by his old friends Tommy and Billy. Jason also quickly makes new friends out of the newer Rangers Adam Park, Katherine Hillard and Tanya Sloan. However, Rocky soon becomes disturbed by his teammates' love for Jason, as he feels he is being replaced by the Ranger he previously replaced. After risking his life to prove himself to be worthy despite Jason's popularity, Rocky eventually accepts Jason as a friend. Rocky also adopts the same jovial relationship with Jason that he has with everyone else. When Tommy gets kidnapped by Prince Gasket, Katherine steps forward to break the spell under Tommy and Jason and the others follow her lead. Jason is also chosen by Tanya to become the guardian of Auric the Conqueror after he promises that he can be trusted with it. However he ends up getting it stolen from. Despite his mistake, Tanya forgives him.  He also dates a local waitress, Emily (Lesley Pedersen).

Jason returns the Gold Ranger powers to Trey in the final episode of Zeo when he finds out that he cannot handle it much longer, as they are draining away - along with his life force - due to the Gold Ranger powers not being intended for human physiology. However, there are no apparent long-term effects, and Jason appears perfectly healthy after he transfers it back to Trey. Retired from superheroics once more, Jason then happily focuses on his relationship with Emily. Jason drops out of High School and doesn't graduate with the others. He does make his return in the Turbo movie.

Turbo: A Power Rangers Movie
Jason and Kimberly both return in Turbo: A Power Rangers Movie. The film throughout suggests they may be romantically linked, having gotten together sometime after Jason's turn as the Gold Ranger. They are first seen scuba diving together, but are then kidnapped by the villainess Divatox and are briefly brainwashed to fight against the Turbo Rangers. It appears that the evil influence enhanced his own emotional aspects, as at one point he taunts Tommy with "Now I'm the one with the muscles and the power!". After being restored to normal by Lerigot, he once again fades into the background, with Jason's appearance in the film being replacing the injured Rocky in a martial arts tournament and ultimately winning the match, alongside Tommy and Adam. At the end of the match, Jason can be seen celebrating and holding hands with Kimberly. In the credits- Jason and Kimberly can be seen hugging.

Power Rangers Wild Force
Jason returns in Power Rangers Wild Force, in the special episode "Forever Red", which celebrated the tenth anniversary of Power Rangers. In this special, he utilizes his original Red Ranger powers and joins nine other Red Rangers (which includes Tommy, but not Rocky, as Steve Cardenas was moving at the time and unable to be reached, to defeat the remnants of the Machine Empire, a force of villains that Jason had previously battled as the Gold Ranger. Jason is very rude to Cole and acts very rude to Tommy in the episode by constantly talking during Tommys meeting with the others. Stepping over Tommys leadership with such disrespect. After the events of "Forever Red," Jason returns to living a normal life, though he presumably still retains his Red Ranger powers.

Power Rangers Super Megaforce
Jason and the other Mighty Morphin Power Rangers return as part of the army of Legendary Rangers led by Tommy that helped the Mega Rangers defeat the Armada once and for all, fighting in a huge battle against hundreds of XBorgs and dozens of Bruisers. However, Austin St. John did not return and Jason only appears morphed, as do the other Mighty Morphin rangers besides Tommy.

Power Rangers Beast Morphers
Jason returns in Season 2 of Power Rangers Beast Morphers, in the special episode "Grid Connection".

When Jason's old foe Goldar is reanimated by Evox/Venjix as Goldar Maximus and dispatched to the dimension of the Dino Charge Power Rangers to gather energems, Jason is summoned by Grid Battleforce Red Ranger Devon to help him save the Dino Charge Rangers as well as members of Devon's own team. It is revealed that Jason's Tyrannosaurus Power Coin has laid dormant within a meteorite for an undisclosed amount of time. Devon hands the coin back to Jason. Jason eventually summons the rest of his Mighty Morphin team and the Dino Thunder Power Rangers to assist him against the army led by Goldar Maximus.

Other versions

2017 film
Jason appears as the main protagonist (arguably alongside Kimberly and Billy) in the 2017 reboot film, played by Australian actor Dacre Montgomery. A former high school football star, Jason ruins his potential career when he pulls a prank by bringing a bull into the school's changing room, leaving him sentenced to weekend detentions until the end of the year. He also gains a knee injury for his right leg when he flips his truck during an escape attempt on that fateful night. After he protects Billy Cranston from a bully during the detention, Billy helps Jason shut down his house arrest ankle monitor in return for driving Billy out to the old mines where Billy used to go with his father, resulting in them discovering the Power Coins at the same time as Kimberly, Trini and Zack are in the area. When they experience sudden bursts of strength and speed, (along with having Jason's knee heal overnight), the five return to the place where they found the coins and discover Zordon and Alpha 5 in the spaceship buried underground. Although skeptical at the story presented by Zordon, Jason soon accepts his role as leader and works to rally the team, even daring to confront Rita Repulsa when they have yet to master their powers. This attack on Rita results in Billy's death, but the sight of the team coming together prompts Zordon to selflessly sacrifice a chance to return to life and instead resurrect Billy, allowing the new Rangers to battle Rita after Zordon's team failed. He even wields a sword that once belonged to Zordon, and saves his dad's life without revealing his identity. Jason and Kimberly are hinted to romantically interested in each other in this adaptation with a deleted scene of a kiss between them confirming this.

Comics
Jason appeared in numerous comic books by Marvel Comics and Papercutz.

Jason also appears in the Mighty Morphin Power Rangers comic from Boom Studios. This version of Jason is shown to have romantic interest in Trini Kwan (Yellow Ranger) and briefly Lauren Shiba (second Red Samurai Ranger).

Jason also has a parallel universe doppelgänger, who not only has the Red Ranger powers but also the White Ranger's.  This Jason was an archenemy of Lord Drakkon, who is an evil parallel universe doppelgänger of Tommy Oliver.  Lord Drakkon ultimately killed his world's Jason and takes his enemy's White Ranger powers and Red Ranger helmet as trophies, and eliminates their world's Power Rangers.

When Lord Drakkon mounted a mass attack on every Ranger team in history, Jason eventually found himself acting as leader of the forces arrayed against Drakkon, using the Dragon Shield and the Dragonzord as he issued commands to the Rangers from the future. In the process, he also formed a relationship with Lauren Shiba, the surviving Red Ranger of the Samurai Rangers, but the conclusion of this storyline erased Drakkon's attack from history, with the result that Jason and Lauren's relationship was also erased.

Mighty Morphin Power Rangers: Pink
While Kimberly Hart is the main character in this comic book miniseries MMPR: Pink, published by Boom! Studios, Jason is mentioned numerous times. The series is a modern remake but also serves as an effective continuation from Kimberly's exit in the third season of the original show. Kimberly needs to rescue a French town under siege from Goldar and she seeks help from Zordon. He temporarily makes Kimberly the pink Power Ranger again by using the Sword of Light to activate the latent pink energy within her. Kimberly asks Zordon if she can be taken to Jason, Zack and Trini but is told Jason has a mission of his own which explains his absence from this series. Instead, the role of the Red Ranger is filled by a new character named Britt who becomes the first female red Mighty Morphin Power Ranger. It is suggested at the end of the comic that Jason is the "other guy" in the infamous "Dear John" letter that Kimberly wrote to Tommy.

References

Further reading
The Official Mighty Morphin Power Rangers Guidebook ,

External links
 Official Power Rangers Website

American superheroes
Crossover characters in television
Mighty Morphin Power Rangers
Power Rangers characters
Power Rangers Zeo
Fictional karateka
Fictional kenjutsuka
Fictional male martial artists
Fictional characters from California
Fictional stick-fighters
Fictional swordfighters
Male superheroes
Teenage characters in television
Television characters introduced in 1993